The Metro Conference baseball tournament was the conference baseball championship of the NCAA Division I Metro Conference from 1976 through 1995.  The winner of the tournament received an automatic berth to the NCAA Division I Baseball Championship.

Champions

By year
The following is a list of conference champions and sites listed by year.

† - Due to rain on the day of the title game, Florida State and Southern Miss were named co-champions in 1991.

By school
The following is a list of conference champions listed by school.

† - Due to rain on the day of the title game, Florida State and Southern Miss were named co-champions in 1991.

References

Tournament
NCAA Division I baseball conference tournaments